The Grand Rapids Griffins are a professional ice hockey team based in Grand Rapids, Michigan.  The team is a member of the Central Division in the Western Conference of the American Hockey League (AHL).  The Griffins began as an independent expansion franchise in the International Hockey League (IHL) in 1996.  After failing to qualify for the IHL playoffs in their third season, the Griffins entered into an affiliation agreement with the Ottawa Senators of the National Hockey League (NHL).  In the following season, the team finished the regular season in first place in the Eastern Conference and won the conference in the playoffs before losing to the Chicago Wolves in the Turner Cup Finals.  In the 2000–01 season – the IHL's last before folding – Grand Rapids captured the Fred A. Huber Trophy as the team with the best regular season record.

Grand Rapids, along with five other IHL teams, joined the AHL in 2001.  The Griffins won the West Division in their first season in the league, which was also their last as an affiliate of the Senators.  On January 24, 2002, the franchise signed an affiliation agreement with the NHL's Detroit Red Wings, which has since been extended.  The Griffins' first season as an affiliate of the Red Wings resulted in the team's winning the Central Division in the regular season and reaching the Western Conference finals in the playoffs, where they lost to the Houston Aeros in seven games.  The 2005–06 team won the Macgregor Kilpatrick Trophy for finishing the regular season with the best record; in the playoffs they again lost in the Western Conference finals, this time to the Milwaukee Admirals.

In their 23 seasons in the IHL and AHL, the Grand Rapids Griffins have won over half of the games they have played and qualified for the playoffs in 17 seasons.  The Griffins have won the Calder Cup following the 2012–13 and 2016–17 seasons.

Season-by-season results

International Hockey League (1996–2001)

American Hockey League (2001–present)

Notes
Wins are worth two points, losses are worth zero points and ties, overtime losses and shootout losses are worth one point.

References
General

Specific

Grand Rapids Griffins
American Hockey League team seasons
Michigan sports-related lists